The 1999 Triple J Hottest 100, announced in January 2000, was the seventh such countdown of the most popular songs of the year, according to listeners of the Australian radio station Triple J. As in previous years, a CD featuring 36 (not necessarily the top 36) songs was released.

Full list

52 of the 100 songs were by Australian artists (marked with a green background).

Artists with multiple entries
Four entries
Powderfinger (1, 25, 68, 100)
Silverchair (15, 29, 30, 43)
Three entries
Frenzal Rhomb (26, 34, 64)
Spiderbait (40, 84, 96)
Something for Kate (44, 70, 72)
Two entries
Killing Heidi (2, 14)
Fatboy Slim (4, 23)
Placebo (5, 87)
Red Hot Chili Peppers (10, 37)
Blink-182 (13, 31)
KoЯn (16, 17)
Jebediah (19, 28)
Macy Gray (24, 92)
The Whitlams (38, 54)
Eskimo Joe (39, 99)
The Living End (41, 48)
Custard (42, 83)
Blur (47, 57)
Regurgitator (58, 62)
Ben Harper (65, 85)
Moby (79, 88)

Top 10 Albums of 1999

CD release

Certifications

See also
1999 in music

Notes

1999
1999 in Australian music
1999 record charts